Fisher Community Unit School District 1 is a unified school district located in the village of its namesake, Fisher, Illinois; the village, in turn, is located in the northwestern reaches of Champaign County. Fisher Community Unit School District 1, a district of just under 700 students, is composed of two schools: one consolidated elementary and middle school, and one consolidated junior and senior high school. the first branch of education that can be taken in District 1 will be taken in Fisher Grade School, a school that serves first through sixth graders alongside kindergarteners; the current principal is Jake Palmer; the mascot of the school is the bunnies. Education is continued and completed at Fisher Junior/Senior High School, which builds on the education of those attending on grades seventh through twelfth. The principal of the junior senior high school is Jon Kelly, and the school mascot is the bunnies. The current superintendent of the district is Barb Thompson.

The junior senior high school sports a quizbowl team, and student volunteers perform a play yearly before their classmates. It also sports a student council, a yearbook committee known as "Echo," and a mathematics club, among others.

The district's first school were constructed in 1885 on the present site of the high school at a cost of $5000.00 USD, and it was known as Fisher Grade and High School until the construction of the present grade school in 1914 separated the grades and created a greater sense of efficiency in the district. The creation of Fisher Grade and High School in 1885 obsoleted the twenty-three one room schoolhouses that dominated the region of Champaign County at the time.

References

External links
 
Fisher Grade School Main Page
Fisher Junior/Senior High School Main Page

Education in Champaign County, Illinois
School districts in Illinois
School districts established in 1885
1885 establishments in Illinois